Prince Wilhelm of Urach, Count of Württemberg (27 September 1897 – 8 August 1957) was a member of the German princely House of Württemberg and a senior automotive production engineer.

Most of his professional career was spent working for Daimler-Benz in Stuttgart-Untertürkheim. Between 1941 and 1944, he was sent to France, however, and given responsibility over the technical division of the important Renault company. During these years, he successfully avoided knowing about the covert development of the Renault 4CV, which after 1945, proved crucial to the survival of what became France's largest automobile manufacturer.

Life and career
Wilhelm was the eldest son of Wilhelm Karl, 2nd Duke of Urach and his first wife, known as Amalie, Duchess in Bavaria. On leaving his Stuttgart preparatory school, he moved on, in 1908, to the Karls-Gymnasium (secondary school), passing his Abitur (school leaving examination) in 1914.

War broke out at the end of July 1914, and on 3 August 1914, Wilhelm was drafted into The First Württemberg Field Artillery Regiment. Before the month was over, on 18 August 1914 he was promoted to the rank of Lieutenant. His wartime career included periods of service in Reserve Field Artillery Regiment No.26 and the Imperial Fourth Reserve Corps, and took him to France, Poland, Flanders, Serbia, the Carpathians and Bukovina. On 30 August 1915, he was honoured with the Military Merit Order (Württemberg). On 18 December, he was promoted to the rank of Oberleutnant.

While the war was still underway, probably at the instigation of his father, he enrolled as a "war student" at the University of Tübingen to study Law. However, his own interest was directed more towards engineering and technology. Between 1919 and 1922, Wilhelm studied Mechanical engineering at Stuttgart's Technical Academy, emerging with an engineering degree. As a student, he became a member of the student fraternity "Akademische Gesellschaft Sonderbund" in Stuttgart.

Following his graduation, he worked successively for Steiger in Burgrieden, Cockerell in Munich and Bugatti in Molsheim. In 1927, he switched to Daimler-Benz, working at Untertürkheim as a design engineer. In 1933, he joined the top management team and in 1937, he was appointed a chief engineer. His responsibilities included taking care of the Mercedes drivers at sporting events.

During the Second World War, he was mandated to take responsibility for the technical directorship of Renault, based in a northern suburb of Paris. In 1945 he returned to Daimler-Benz as a member of the top management team ("Direktions-Sekretariat"). Between 1946 and 1950, he was in charge of passenger car testing. In 1954, he received Procuration responsibility on behalf of the company, and this was also the year in which he took over the Mercedes-Benz Museum.

He died at Munich on 8 August 1957. He is buried in Stuttgart.

Family
Wilhelm married Elisabeth Theurer on 19 June 1928, in the teeth of opposition from his father voiced when they got engaged. Elisabeth was the daughter of Richard Theurer, General Director of G. Siegle & Co., a long-established Stuttgart manufacturer of dyes and colourings, and his wife Elisabeth Groß. By the date of his marriage, Wilhelm's father had been dead for nearly three months, but the marriage was nonetheless deemed morganatic, and he was required to renounce his right to the title Duke of Urach, Count of Württemberg. Headship of the noble family instead passed to his younger brother, Karl Gero, Duke of Urach.

The marriage produced two recorded daughters, the elder of which, Elisabeth von Urach (b. 1932), obtained a doctorate in psychology and worked in a top job with Stuttgart's Education and Youth Counselling service. The younger daughter, Maria Christine von Urach (1933–1990), mirrored her father's career choice, with a successful 31-year career at Daimler-Benz, starting as an engineer and ending up in charge of Data Processing at Untertürkheim.

See also
 Kingdom of Lithuania (1918)

References

Military personnel of Württemberg
German people of World War I
German mechanical engineers
Bugatti people
Mercedes-Benz Group people
Renault people
House of Urach
Engineers from Stuttgart
1897 births
1957 deaths
Heirs apparent who never acceded